The Order of the Badge of Honour was a civilian award of the Soviet Union.

It was established on 25 November 1935, and was conferred on citizens of the USSR for outstanding achievements in sports, production, scientific research and social, cultural and other forms of social activity; for promotion of economic, scientific, technological, cultural and other ties between the USSR and other countries; and also for significant contribution to basic and applied research.

The order was awarded 1,574,368 times.

The "Order of the Badge of Honour" was replaced by the "Order of Honour" by a Decree of the Presidium of the USSR on 28 December 1988. Following the USSR dissolution, it was replaced by the "Order of Honour" of the Russian Federation, established by Presidential Decree no. 442 of 2 March 1994.

Notable recipients

 Alisa Aksyonova
 Svetlana Alexievich
 Araxie Babayan
 Vadim Bakatin
 Fyokla Bezzubova
 Vasili Blokhin
 Evdokia Bobyleva
 Oleg Bogomolov
 Mariya Borodayevskaya
 Boris Dobrodeev
 Ivan Dubasov
 Alaksandar Dubko
 Kim Pen Hwa
 Faina Kotkowa
 Viacheslav Fetisov
 Mikhail Gorbachev
 Anna Haava
 Zulfi Hajiyev
 Yaroslav Halan
 Rufina Isakova
 Kasymaly Jantöshev
 Ivan Kalita
 Oleg Kalugin
 Shavarsh Karapetyan
 Klaudia Sergejewna Kildisheva
 Sergey Korolyov
 Galina Kulakova
 Aleksandr Kurlovich
 Viktor Kuzkin
 Valentin Ivanov
 Larisa Latynina
 Vladimir Lutchenko
 Aleksandr Maltsev
 Leila Mardanshina
 Boris Mayorov
 Natalya Meklin
 Natalya Melik Melikyan
 Mark Midler
 Mariya Orlyk
 Alexander Ragulin
 Vladimir Rvachev
 Anatoliy Smirnov
 Vitali Smirnov
 Pavel Sukhoi
 Amet-khan Sultan
 Gunsyn Tsydenova
 Tankho Israelov
 Alina Vedmid
 Boris Yeltsin
 Sorojon Yusufova
 Igor Ursov
 Shakirat Utegaziyev
 Dimitri Venediktov
 Valery Khodemchuk
 Nina Viktorovna Pigulevskaya
 Eliso Virsaladze
 Alexander Aslanikashvili

See also 
 Order of Honour (Russian Federation)
 Awards and decorations of the Soviet Union
 Awards and decorations of the Russian Federation

References 

Badge of Honor, Order of the
Awards established in 1935
Awards disestablished in 1988
1935 establishments in the Soviet Union
1988 disestablishments in the Soviet Union